Bernard Matthew Cassidy VC (17 August 1892 – 28 March 1918) was an English recipient of the Victoria Cross, the highest and most prestigious award for gallantry in the face of the enemy that can be awarded to British and Commonwealth forces.

Details
Cassidy was 25 years old, and a second lieutenant in the 2nd Battalion, The Lancashire Fusiliers, British Army during the First World War at the German spring offensive when the following deed took place for which he was awarded the VC.

On 28 March 1918 at Arras, France, at a time when the flank of the division was in danger, Second Lieutenant Cassidy was in command of the left company of his battalion. He had been given orders to hold on to the position at all costs and he carried out this instruction to the letter. Although the enemy came in overwhelming numbers he continued to rally and encourage his men, under terrific bombardment until the company was eventually surrounded and he was killed.

He is remembered on the Arras Memorial. Cassidy has a street named after him in Canning Town in London called Bernard Cassidy Street. His VC is on display in the Lord Ashcroft Gallery at the Imperial War Museum, London.

References

Monuments to Courage (David Harvey, 1999)
The Register of the Victoria Cross (This England, 1997)
VCs of the First World War - Spring Offensive 1918 (Gerald Gliddon, 1997)

External links
 

1892 births
1918 deaths
People from Camden Town
British World War I recipients of the Victoria Cross
British military personnel killed in World War I
Lancashire Fusiliers officers
British Army personnel of World War I
British Army recipients of the Victoria Cross
Irish Guards soldiers
English people of Irish descent
Military personnel from London